Li Zai; ca. (unknown-1431) was a Chinese painter of landscapes and human figures during the Ming Dynasty (1368–1644). His specific birth year is not known.

Li was born in Putian in Fujian province and active during the Xuande era. His style name was 'Yizheng'. Li's painting followed the style of Guo Xi, Ma Yuan, and Xia Gui.

References

1431 deaths
Painters from Fujian
Ming dynasty landscape painters
People from Putian
Year of birth unknown